Guangdong-Hong Kong Cup 2001–02 is the 24th staging of this two-leg competition between Hong Kong and Guangdong.

The first leg was played in Hong Kong while the second leg was played in Guangzhou.

Hong Kong captured champion again by winning an aggregate 3–2 against Guangdong.

Squads

Hong Kong
Some of the players in the squad include:
  Cheng Siu Chung Ricky 鄭兆聰
  Chan Ka Ki 陳家麒
  Yau Kin Wai 丘建威
  Lau Chi Keung 劉志強
  Lo Kai Wah 羅繼華
  Au Wai Lun 歐偉倫
  Cheung Sai Ho 蔣世豪
  Gerard Ambassa Guy 卓卓
  Gary McKeown 麥基昂
  Cristiano Preigchadt Cordeiro 高尼路
  Hartwig Carlo Andre Bieleman 安德烈
  Cornelius Udebuluzor 哥連斯
  Keith Gumbs 基夫
  Finho 仙奴

Results
First Leg

Second Leg

References
 HKFA website 省港盃回憶錄(九) (in chinese)

 

2002
2001 in Chinese football
2002 in Chinese football
2001–02 in Hong Kong football